Bae Da-bin (born on 24 December 1993) is a South Korean actress. She is known for her roles in Gangnam Beauty (2018) and Do You Like Brahms? (2020). She has acted in two films: Beautiful Voice (2019) and Pipeline (2021). In 2021 she appeared in Netflix series Love Alarm 2. In 2022, she appeared in the KBS weekend drama It's Beautiful Now as main lead.

Career
Bae Da-bin started her career as a model. She first appeared in SBS 2018 TV series Should We Kiss First?. She gained recognition from her supporting role in JTBC's Gangnam Beauty and MBC's Less Than Evil (2018). She then appeared in major roles in tvN's Arthdal Chronicles (2019) SBS's Do You Like Brahms? (2020) and Netflix original Love Alarm season 2 in 2021. She was also cast in film Pipeline (2021).

In 2022 she was cast in KBS weekend drama It's Beautiful Now as main lead, which was premiered on April 2.

Personal life
Bae spent her formative days in New Zealand as she moved to the country when she was in the fifth grade of elementary school. She came to Korea at the age of twenty-one, and worked as part-timer in broadcasting industry. Her younger brother is Bae Ho-young, who is currently active as a member of boy group Verivery.

Filmography

Films

Television series

Web series

Accolades

References

External links
 
 Bae Da-bin on Daum 

21st-century South Korean actresses
South Korean film actresses
South Korean television actresses
Living people
1993 births